The following is the list of episodes for Geo television drama serial Numm. The drama serial formally began August 24, 2013. Individual episodes are numbered.

Drama Overview

Episode list
Following is the listing of episodes with short summaries.

Synopsis

Set in 2013, Wali Bakht is an Oxford graduate, belongs to a traditional, strict feudal family, his grandfather Sikander Bakht (Bade Sahab) is the head of family and decision maker, after the death of Wali's father in his childhood due to unreveal circumstances his mother become mentally ill and Wali's get married with a girl named Mahjabeen triple of his age to take care of him, through the illegal costume vani. After his return from London he is forced to re-married with Neelum Akbar Khan to maintained and for the survival of his creed, Neelum is a daughter of Wali's uncle, a rebel and proud girl who hates her family customs and traditions and want to get rid off, but fate doesn't allow her and she marries Wali. Mahjabeen has its position in house nothing more than of servant and she seems to happily perform her duties toward Wali and his house, In future it will reveal what actually has happened with family in past, for now story is revolving around three characters Wali, Neelum and Mahjabeen.

See also
 Numm (2013 Drama)
 List of Pakistani actresses
 List of Pakistani actors
 List of Pakistani television serials

References

External links
Official Websites for Numm
 
 Numm On TV.com.pk
 Numm On Harpalgeo.tv

Videos for Numm 
 To watch all Episodes of Numm

Reviews for Numm
 Numm Episode 01 Review by Fatima Awan Ratings: 4.2/5
 Numm Episode 02 Review by Fatima Awan Ratings: 4.6/5
 Numm Episode 03 Review by Fatima Awan Ratings: 5.0/5
 Numm Episode 04 Review by Fatima Awan 
 Numm Episode 05 Review by Fatima Awan
 Numm Episode 06 Review by Fatima Awan 

Numm